Jakub Šimoňák (born 5 June 1996) is a Slovak luger. He competed in the men's singles event at the 2018 Winter Olympics.

References

External links
 

1996 births
Living people
Slovak male lugers
Olympic lugers of Slovakia
Lugers at the 2018 Winter Olympics
Sportspeople from Spišská Nová Ves